The Eurovision Young Musicians 2002 was the eleventh edition of the Eurovision Young Musicians, held at Konzerthaus in Berlin, Germany on 19 June 2002. Organised by the European Broadcasting Union (EBU) and host broadcaster Zweites Deutsches Fernsehen (ZDF), musicians from seven countries participated in the televised final. A total of twenty countries took part in the competition. All participants performed a classical piece of their choice accompanied by the Deutsches Symphonie-Orchester Berlin, conducted by Marek Janowski.  and  made their début while six countries returned to the contest, they were Croatia, Cyprus, Denmark, Greece, Italy and Sweden.

Dalibor Karvay of Austria won the contest, with United Kingdom and Slovenia placing second and third respectively.

Location

The Konzerthaus Berlin, a concert hall situated on the Gendarmenmarkt square in the central Mitte district of Berlin, was the host venue for the 2002 edition of the Eurovision Young Musicians.

Built as a theatre from 1818 to 1821 under the name of the Schauspielhaus Berlin, later also known as the Theater am Gendarmenmarkt and Komödie, its usage changed to a concert hall after the Second World War and its name changed to its present one in 1994. It is the home to the Konzerthausorchester Berlin symphony orchestra.

Format
Julia Fischer was the host of the 2002 contest.

Results

Preliminary round
A total of twenty countries took part in the preliminary round of the 2002 contest, of which seven qualified to the televised grand final. The following countries failed to qualify.

 Cyprus

Final 
Awards were given to the top three countries. The third-place musician received €2,000, second-place €3,000, and the winner €5,000. The table below highlights these using gold, silver, and bronze. The placing results of the remaining participants is unknown and never made public by the European Broadcasting Union.

Jury members
The jury members consisted of the following:

 – Leonard Slatkin (head)
 – Gian Carlo Menotti
 – Anna Gourari
 – Jack Martin Händler
 – Aurèle Nicolet
 – Hans Peter Pairott
/ – Carole Dawn Reinhart

Broadcasting
The 20th anniversary competition was transmitted live over the Eurovision Network by 11 out of the 27 broadcasters in 23 countries. Belgium, Iceland and Malta broadcast the contest (the latter two for the first time), in addition to the competing countries.

See also
 Eurovision Song Contest 2002

References

External links 
 

Eurovision Young Musicians by year
2002 in music
2002 in Germany
Music festivals in Germany
Events in Berlin
June 2002 events in Europe